The FIM Trial World Championship and FIM X-Trial World Championship are the most prestigious motorcycle trials tournaments of the world, organised by the Fédération Internationale de Motocyclisme. The outdoor championship is held since 1964 and the indoor (X-Trial) since 1993.

From 1964 to 1967 the championship was named Challenge Henry Groutards. From 1968 to 1974, it was the Trial European Championship, and from 1975 onwards it has been known as the World Championship.

Up until 2010, the outdoor world trial championship has been won by 6 different pilots from the UK, 5 from Spain, 2 from Finland and France, and 1 from Belgium, Germany, United States, Japan and Sweden. Since 2005, only Spanish pilots have won the outdoor and the indoor world trial championships.

World Trials Champions
"Note: Green background denotes International Trial Master Championship."
"Note: Pink background denotes European Championship."

Championships per rider 

As of September 2022, the following ranking shows the riders with most world titles, in outdoor, indoor and total:

Championships per country 
As of September 2021, the following ranking shows the countries with most world titles, in outdoor, indoor and total:

See also 
 FIM Trial European Championship
 Trial des Nations
 Scott Trial
 Scottish Six Days Trial
 NATC Trials Championship

References

External links 
 FIM Trial GP official website
 FIM X-Trial official website
 FIM Trial World Championship at the FIM official website
 FIM X-Trial World Championship at the FIM official website

Motorcycle trials
World motorcycle racing series
Motorcycle off-road racing series